Suzy Delair (born Suzette Pierrette Delaire; December 31, 1917 – March 15, 2020) was a French actress, dancer, singer, comedian and star of vaudeville.

Early years
Growing up in Montmartre, Delair was the daughter of a father who upholstered expensive cars' interiors, and a seamstress mother. She studied music at La Scala.

Film
Born in Paris, she acted in films directed by Henri-Georges Clouzot, Jean Dréville, Jean Grémillon, Marcel L'Herbier, Christian-Jaque, Marcel Carné, Luchino Visconti, René Clément and Gérard Oury. 

In 1947, Delair had a supporting role in The Murder Lives at Number 21, which had its American premiere in New York City. Today's audiences probably know her best as the feminine lead in the Laurel and Hardy comedy Atoll K (also known as Utopia), filmed in France and released in 1951.

Music
Before Delair began performing in films, she starred in operettas. On 28 February 1948 she sang C'est si bon at the Hotel Negresco during the first Nice Jazz Festival. Louis Armstrong was present and loved the song. On 26 June 1950 he recorded the American version of the song (English lyrics by Jerry Seelen) in New York City with Sy Oliver and his orchestra. When it was released, the disc was a worldwide success and the song was then performed by the greatest international singers.

Personal life
For 12 years, Delair was the companion of French film director, producer and screenwriter Henri-Georges Clouzot.

Selected filmography

 A Caprice of Pompadour (Willy Wolff et Joë Hamman, 1931) – Une soubrette de la Pompadour
 Imperial Violets (Henri Roussell), 1932)
 La Dame de chez Maxim's (Alexander Korda), 1933)
 Let's Touch Wood (1933) – La petite compagne d'amusement
 Professeur Cupidon (1933)
 Casanova (1934)
 Poliche (1934) – Une Danseuse (uncredited)
 The Depression Is Over (Robert Siodmak, 1934)
 The Crisis is Over (1934) – (uncredited)
 Dédé (Abel Gance, 1934) – Poliche (uncredited)
 Gold in the Street (K. Bernhardt, 1934) – Madeleine – L'amie de Gaby
 Ferdinand le noceur (1935) – Madame Alice – Une prostituée de la maison close (uncredited)
 Les Sœurs Hortensias (1935) – Une femme au cabaret (uncredited)
 Prends la route (Jean Boyer, 1936)
 Trois Six Neuf (Raymond Rouleau, 1937)
 The Last of the Six (Georges Lacombe, 1941) – Mila Malou
 The Murderer Lives at Number 21 (Henri-Georges Clouzot, 1942) – Mila Malou
 Défense d'aimer (Richard Pottier, 1942) – Totte
 La Vie de Bohème (Marcel L'Herbier, 1945) – Phémie / Femia
 Confessions of a Rogue (Jean Dréville, 1947) – Coralin–
 Quai des Orfèvres / Jenny Lamour (Henri-Georges Clouzot, 1947) – Jenny Lamour
 Par la fenêtre (Gilles Grangier, 1948) – Fernande
 White Paws (Jean Grémillon, 1949) – Odette Kerouan
 I'm in the Revue (Mario Soldati, 1950) – La Chanteuse
 Lady Paname (Henri Jeanson, 1950) – Raymonde Bosset, dite Caprice
 Lost Souvenirs (Christian-Jaque, 1950) – Suzy Henebey (episode "Une couronne mortuaire")
 Utopia (Léo Joannon, 1951) – Chérie Lamour
 Fly in the Ointment (Guy Lefranc, 1955) – Lucette Gauthier
 Fernandel the Dressmaker (Jean Boyer, 1956) – Adrienne Vignard
 Gervaise (René Clément, 1956) – Virginie Poisson
 The Regattas of San Francisco (Claude Autant-Lara, 1960) – Lucilla
 Rocco e i suoi fratelli ("Rocco and his Brothers", Luchino Visconti, 1960) – Luisa
 Du Mouron pour les petits oiseaux ("Chicken Feed for Little Birds", Marcel Carné, 1963) – Antoinette – La bouchère
 Paris brûle-t-il? (René Clément, 1966) – A Parisienne (uncredited) 
 The Mad Adventures of "Rabbi" Jacob (Gérard Oury, 1973) – Germaine Pivert
 Forget Me, Mandoline (1976) – Mireille

References

External links 
 
 
 

1917 births
2020 deaths
French centenarians
French film actresses
French women singers
Officers of the Ordre national du Mérite
Officiers of the Légion d'honneur
Singers from Paris
Actresses from Paris
Women centenarians
Vaudeville performers